Paramakanda Raja Maha Vihara is an ancient Buddhist temple in Puttalam District, Sri Lanka. The temple is located in Paramakanda village approximately  distance from the Anamaduwa town. The site has been formally recognised by the Government as an archaeological site in Sri Lanka. The designations were declared on 1 November 1996 and 6 June 2008 under the government Gazette numbers 948 and 1586.

The temple

It is believed that the history of Paramakanda temple goes back to the reign of king Walagamba (103 BC and c. 89–77 BC).

The Vihara complex mainly consists of two terraces. The lower terrace includes the Stupa, Bodhi tree, dripledged rock caves, Bikkhu dwellings, the main image house and the bell tower. Another small image house, a Stupa and a rock carved foot print of Buddha are found in the upper temple premises. The main image house of the lower terrace is adorned with paintings and sculptures belonging to the Kandyan tradition as well as the new art style.

Inscriptions

Few rock inscriptions have been discovered in the temple premises. One inscription has been incised on the vertical face of a rock at one side of a small pool of water. Another inscription is found on a rock near Bo tree and belongs to the 7th century A.D.

The inscription near the pool

See also
 Thonigala Rock Inscription, Anamaduwa

References

External links
 

Buddhist temples in Puttalam District
Buddhist caves in Sri Lanka
Archaeological protected monuments in Puttalam District
Sri Lanka inscriptions